Nothobroscus chilensis is a species of beetle in the family Carabidae, the only species in the genus Nothobroscus.

References

Nothobroscina
Monotypic Carabidae genera